Major-General John Matthew Blakiston-Houston  (18 April 1882 − 16 December 1959) was a senior British Army officer.

Military career
Blakiston-Houston transferred from the militia into the 11th Hussars on 15 February 1902. He served in the First World War as deputy assistant adjutant and quartermaster-general for the 3rd Cavalry Division and then as assistant adjutant and quartermaster-general for the 1st Cavalry Division.

After attending and graduating from the Staff College, Camberley, in 1919, he went on to become commanding officer of the 12th Royal Lancers in September 1923, commander of the 2nd Cavalry Brigade in October 1927 and Chief Administration Officer, Northern Command in November 1931. After that he became commandant of the School of Equitation in Weedon Bec in August 1934 before retiring in August 1938. In 1937, the year before his retirement, he had been considered for the command of the Mobile Division, later the 1st Armoured Division, but Leslie Hore-Belisha, the Secretary of State for War, turned down the idea, in the belief that all Blakistan-Houston could do was "slap his thigh and shout".

He was recalled to become General Officer Commanding (GOC) of the 59th (Staffordshire) Infantry Division in September 1939 and GOC Midland Area in May 1940 before returning to retirement with his wife in January 1942.

References

Bibliography

External links
Generals of World War II

1882 births
1959 deaths
British Army generals of World War II
11th Hussars officers
British Army personnel of World War I
Companions of the Distinguished Service Order
Companions of the Order of the Bath
Graduates of the Staff College, Camberley
People educated at Cheltenham College
British Army major generals